The Catholic Church in Hungary or Hungarian Catholic Church is part of the worldwide Catholic Church, under the spiritual leadership of the Pope in Rome.

According to a 2019 survey by Eurobarometer, 62% of Hungarians consider themselves Catholics. The country is divided into 12 dioceses including 4 archdioceses. In addition, there is a territorial abbey and a separate sui juris particular Church for those who adhere to the Byzantine Rite known as the Hungarian Greek Catholic Church.

History

From early times to the accession of St. Stephen (997) 
Since the early times the territory of the former Kingdom of Hungary were inhabited by many peoples followed by several waves of migrations until the Hungarian conquest of the Carpathian Basin.

At about the same time, under their leader Árpád ( 845 –  907), they began once more expeditions to the countries west of them in order to recon the neighboring environments and secure their newly founded realm; these forays, which went as far as Germany, Italy, and France, were continued under Zoltán (907-47), and Taksony (947-72), and did not cease until the land was converted to Catholicism in the reign of Géza. In 954, by the siege of the Gembloux Abbey, St. Guilbert entered to the unarmed resting Hungarians while the other part of their army was fighting. The Hungarians listened to him and more of them were baptized and accepted the religion. However, by the captives as well many Christians get among Hungarians. Their defeats near Merseburg, in 933, and on the Lech, in 955, put an end to these western expeditions.

As a result of the eastern campaigns Byzantine monks and missionaries could arrive into the south, southeast of the Carpathian basin. In Constantinopole, many Hungarian leaders could have been baptized, as the Byzantine emperor tried to oblige them with generous gifts, titles or acted as a godfather in order to make them to accept the faith. Especially, Gyula II and Bulcsú was baptized. The first known Byzantine monk was Hierotheos who was invited by Gyula and were allowed to maintain proselytism in the territories ruled by him in Transylvania, though not any ecclesiastic institution were created. Her daughter, Sarolt (the later wife of Géza) was baptized here. In Marosvár (today part of Cenad, Romania), the persistent activities of Byzantine monks are proven. Also it is suggested that the foundation of the Abbey of Veszprém is connected to Sarolt, where the founding document in Greek differ in a relevant way from other contemporary Latin documents.

The conversion of the land to the Catholic Faith was effected, in reality, from the west, and the change began in the ruling family. Duke Géza, who from 970 had been the sole ruler of Hungary, perceived the danger which threatened Hungary, surrounded as it was by Catholic countries, if it continued pagan. He saw that, if Hungary persisted in shutting out Catholicism, it would sooner or later be the prey of the neighbouring peoples. His possible second marriage with Adelaide (Adelhaid von Beleknegina) - that is not widely accepted -, sister of the Polish Duke Mieszko (Mieczyslaw), brought him closer to the Church and his conversion is to be attributed to Adelaide's influence. It was through Adelaide's efforts that St. Adalbert, Archbishop of Prague, came to Hungary and, in 985, baptized Géza and his son Vajk; the latter took the name of Stephen in baptism. A large number of the most prominent of Géza's retainers and of his people embraced the Catholic Faith at the same time. Evil results arose, however, from the fact that Adalbert did not at once establish an ecclesiastical organization for Hungary. Moreover, a large proportion of the newly converted adopted the new faith only in externals and retained their heathen customs, offering sacrifices to the old gods. Yet, notwithstanding all this, the new religion continued to spread among the people.

Reign of St. Stephen (997–1038) 
The actual conversion of the country and its ecclesiastical organization was the work of St. Stephen, son of Duke Géza, who succeeded his father in 997. His marriage with Gisela, sister of Duke Henry of Bavaria, gave a powerful impulse to the spread of Catholicism. From Germany came large numbers of priests, nobles, and knights, who settled in Hungary and aided Stephen in converting the country to Christianity. Many obstacles were encountered, and the new religion was spread by the sword. The advance of Christianity was regarded as endangering national interests, and the influx of strangers, together with the favour shown these new settlers by the ruler, seemed to set aside the national influences in the government. Consequently, soon after the accession of Stephen, a revolt led by Koppány broke out, but it was quickly suppressed, with the aid of the foreign knights; in this way the reputation both of Stephen and of the Church was established in the regions on the farther side of the Danube. To show his gratitude for this victory Stephen built the monastery of Pannonhalma. Stephen's victory was also followed by the coming of large numbers of German, French, and Italian ecclesiastics to Hungary, which greatly aided the spread of Christianity.

Stephen now undertook the task of providing the land with the necessary ecclesiastical organization. In order to secure the independence both of the country and of the Church in his dominions, he petitioned Pope Sylvester II - through Astrik - for the royal dignity and the confirmation of his ecclesiastical acts and ordinances; he also placed his dominion under the protectorate of the Holy See. Sylvester acceded to Stephen's request, sent him a royal crown, and confirmed his ecclesiastical regulations. According to tradition, Stephen also received the title of Apostolic King and Apostolic Legate, the right to have a legate's cross carried before him, and other privileges. After the return of Astrik, Stephen was crowned King of Hungary with the crown sent by the pope at Esztergom or Székesfehérvár, the exact date of the coronation is unknown, the traditions mark the eve of 1001. In settling the organization of the Church he placed at its head the Archdiocese of Esztergom, giving it as suffragans, Győr, Veszprém, Pécs, Vác and Eger. About 1010 he founded a second archdiocese, that of Kalocsa, which had as suffragans the Dioceses of Bihar founded around 1020 and Marosvár founded in 1035. In this way the land was divided into ten dioceses, the Archdiocese of Esztergom being the metropolitan. The Benedictines settled in Hungary during this reign, and Stephen founded the Benedictine monasteries of Pannonhalma, Zobor, Pécsvárad, Zalavár, and Bakonybél; he also founded numerous other religious houses, including the convent for Greek nuns near Veszprém.

In order to provide for the support of the clergy, Stephen issued edicts concerning church tithes; he ordained that each tenth township should build a church and provide the priest with suitable land and servants for his support. The king was to supply the churches with all the necessary equipment, while the bishop selected the priests and provided the books needed. The laws of King Stephen also contain ordinances regarding attendance at Mass, observance of the church fasts, and so on, with the aid of these laws Stephen brought over almost all of his people to the Catholic faith, although during this reign measures had often to be taken against pagan movements among the population — as against the Bulgarian prince Kean or against Ajtony. These revolts, although political in character, were also aimed more or less at the Catholic faith. Stephen was able to suppress these insurrections, and could, therefore, hope that the Church would meet with no further antagonism.

From Peter to the Battle of Mohács (1038–1526) 

The confusion and wars over the succession, which followed the death of Stephen, and the stormy reigns of Kings Peter and Samuel Aba (1038–46) soon brought about a decline of Christianity. A part of the nation sank back into the old heathenism, and in 1046 there was a revolt against the Catholic religion which led to the martyrdom of Bishop Gerhard, who was thrown by the insurgents from the Blocksberg cliff at Buda into the river. The new king, Andrew I (1046–60), either could not or would not act energetically at first, and it was not until after his coronation that he took strong measures against those who had fallen away from the faith. After his death a small part of the population that was still pagan broke out into revolt, but this rebellion was quickly suppressed by King Béla I (1060–63). The internal disorders during the reigns of King Solomon (1063–74) and King Géza I (1074-77) culminated eventually into a balance regarding the influence of the Holy See, the Holy Roman emperor and the Byzantine emperor, as Géza refused any suzerainty of the first two but asked for crown from the latter that became the lower part of the Holy Crown of Hungary by the end of the 12th century. He kept the Latin rite of the Church and as well built further cathedrals, monasteries and churches.

During the reigns of St. Ladislaus (1077–95) and Koloman (1095-1114) the Church was reformed and many ordinances were passed against the prevailing abuses. In particular the synod of Szabolcs (1092) took decided measures against the marriage of priests. Married priests, as a special act of grace, were permitted to exercise priestly functions, but a new marriage was regarded as concubinage and such unions were to be dissolved. The synod also passed ordinances concerning the indissolubility of marriage and the observance of church festivals and Sundays. Other decisions were directed against the still existing pagan manners and customs. After the conquest of Croatia, Ladislaus founded the Diocese of Zágráb (Agram). He transferred the see of the Archdiocese of Kalocsa to Bács, and that of the Diocese of Bihar, founded by St. Stephen, to Grosswardein (Nagy-Várad). He founded new churches and monasteries and took measures for the conversion of the Bisseni and Saracens (Ishmaelites) who had settled in Hungary. Ladislaus successfully resisted the invasion of the pagan Cumans. During the reign of Koloman the Church was largely under the influence of the royal authority. Koloman claimed the investiture of the bishops for himself, made laws concerning the property of the Church, obliged the bishops to perform military service, etc. At a later date, at the synod of Guastalla, Koloman yielded the right of granting investiture and agreed that the chapters should have freedom in the election of bishops. The reforms of Gregory VII were also adopted in Hungary. The clergy were withdrawn from secular jurisdiction, marriage was regarded as valid only when entered into before a priest, celibacy was enforced, and a number of ordinances beneficial to the religious life were passed.

The chief feature of the reigns of Koloman's successors Stephen II (1114–31), Béla II (1131–41), Géza II (1141–61), and Stephen III (1161-73), was the struggle of Hungary with the Byzantine Empire for national independence. These wars, however, did not check the growth of the Church. About 1150 Saxon colonists of the Catholic Faith settled in upper Hungary and in Transylvania. The Cistercians grew rapidly in Hungary during the reign of Béla III (1173–96), as the king granted the order the same privileges as it enjoyed in France. One of the most important events of this period was the synod at Gran (1169). It enacted that bishops could not be transferred without the consent of the pope, took the administration of vacant dioceses out of the hands of the laity, and obtained a promise from the king that the property of the Church should only be taken in time of war and then not without the consent of the bishop. It was in this period that the Premonstratensians and Knights of St. John also settled in Hungary. In the thirteenth century these orders were followed by the Dominicans and Franciscans: the Hungarian Province of the Dominican Order dates back to the Order's second general chapter, held in Bologna during the spring of 1221.

Fresh disorders sprang up in Hungary after the death of King Béla III. King Emeric (1196-1204) was engaged in war with his brother Andrew, who coveted the throne, until Emeric's death put an end to the fratricidal struggle.

Andrew II (1205–35), who was now king, was soon involved in a struggle with the oligarchy. At his accession he was obliged to swear to protect the liberties of the land and the independence of the royal dignity. When he failed to observe these obligations, the nobles forced him to issue the Golden Bull (1222), the Magna Charta of Hungary. This instrument confirmed the rights of the nobles and gave them the privilege to take up arms against the king when he failed to observe the conditions here agreed upon, but it did not fulfil the hopes it had raised; its provisions were not carried out, and the disorders continued. Neither did Andrew, who in 1217 took part in an unsuccessful crusade to the Holy Land, observe the agreement confirming the liberty of ecclesiastics, and the Catholic Church saw itself endangered by the continually growing influence exerted over the king by the Ishmaelites and Jews. After all warnings to the king had failed, Archbishop Robert of Esztergom placed Hungary under an interdict (1232), in order to force the king to put an end to the prevailing abuses and to guard the interests of the Church. The king promised the correction of the abuses and, especially, to guard the interests of the Catholic Church, but he was too weak a man for energetic action. His son Béla IV (1235–70) endeavoured to restore order, above all he tried to carry out the provisions of the Golden Bull, but his efforts were interfered with by an invasion of the Tatars, which nearly ruined the country. After the battle near Muhi (1241), they devastated the entire land; thousands of the inhabitants were massacred, hundreds of churches were plundered and razed to the ground, and six of the dioceses were nearly destroyed. Consequently, when the Tatars left the country, King Béla was obliged to take up the reorganization both of ecclesiastical and secular affairs. The damage suffered was repaired through the self-sacrifice of the royal family and the people; new monasteries and churches were built, those that had been destroyed were restored, and colonists were brought in to repair the losses in population. These colonists were partly Catholic Germans and Bohemians, and partly pagan Cumans. Those of the Cumans who lived apart from the others were soon converted, but the majority held to paganism and did not become Christians until the middle of the fourteenth century.

The last years of the reign of Béla IV were disturbed by a quarrel with the Curia concerning the appointment to the vacant Diocese of Zágráb (Agram), and by the revolt of his son Stephen, who succeeded him. Stephen V reigned only two years (1270–72); he was followed by his son Ladislaus IV (1272–90) who, when he came to the throne, was still a minor. In this reign efforts were made to restore church discipline that had fallen into decay during the disorders of the previous years. For this decline of church discipline and of ecclesiastical conditions the pagan Cumans were largely responsible; they wandered about the land plundering and damaging the churches. The king was on good terms with them and maintained relations with Cumanian women; his example was followed by others. It is not surprising that under the circumstances disorders broke out once more in Hungary, and that the authority of the Church suffered. Philip, Bishop of Fermo, came to Hungary in 1279 as papal legate and held a great synod at Buda (Ofen), where various decisions were reached concerning the preservation of the interests of the Church and the restoration of canon law, but the synod was forcibly dissolved by the king, and its members driven away. The appeals made by the Hungarian bishops and the Holy See to the king were in vain; Ladislaus promised, indeed, to act differently, and to reform the disordered political and ecclesiastical conditions, but he failed to keep his word. After the murder of Ladislaus, the last of the Arpád dynasty, Andrew III, grandson of Andrew II, became king. During his reign of ten years (1290-1301) he was engaged in a constant struggle with foreign claimants to the throne, and could give no care to the internal and ecclesiastical conditions of the country. Rudolf of Habsburg endeavoured to wrest Hungary from Andrew for his son Albrecht, and the grandson of Stephen V, Charles Martell of Naples, also claimed it. After the death of the latter, who had the support of the Holy See, his son, Charles Robert, maintained the father's claims, and from 1295 assumed the title of King of Hungary.

After the death of Andrew III a series of wars broke out over the succession. A part of the people and clergy held to King Wenceslaus, another to Otto, Duke of Bavaria, and still another to Charles Robert. The Holy See strongly espoused the cause of Charles Robert and sent Cardinal Gentile to Hungary. Notwithstanding these efforts in his favour, it was not until 1309 that Charles Robert (1309-42) was able to secure the throne of Hungary for himself. There now began for the country a long period of consolidation. The new king regulated the internal administration, brought the state finances into good order, imposing for this purpose in 1323 a land tax, reorganized the army, and sought to increase his dynastic power by forming connexions with foreign countries. In church affairs he encroached largely on ecclesiastical rights; he filled the vacant sees and the church offices without regard to the electoral rights of the cathedral chapters. He claimed the revenues of vacant benefices for himself, confiscated the incomes of other benefices, granted large numbers of expectancies, and forced those appointed to ecclesiastical benefices to pay a larger or smaller sum before taking office. In 1338 a part of the Hungarian episcopate sent a memorial to the Apostolic See, in which, with some exaggeration, they presented an account of the encroachments of the king. The pope notified the king of the memorial, an act which created no ill-feeling between the two; the pope contented himself with admonishing the king in a paternal manner to remove the abuses and to avoid infringing on the rights of the Church.

During the reign of Louis I, the Great (1342–82), the son of Charles Robert, Catholicism reached the height of prosperity in Hungary. Numerous monasteries and other religious foundations came into existence in this reign; above all, the Hermits of St. Paul enjoyed the king's special favour. In 1381 Louis obtained from the Republic of Venice the relics of St. Paul the Hermit, which were taken with great ecclesiastical pomp to the Pauline monastery near Buda. Among his pious acts must be counted the building of the church at the place of pilgrimage, Gross-Mariazell in Styria, and of the chapel dedicated to St. Ladislaus at Aachen. Splendid churches were also built in Hungary, as at Gran, Eger, and Grosswardein (Nagy-Várad). In filling ecclesiastical offices the king was careful that the dioceses should receive well-trained and competent bishops. In order to promote learning he founded the university at Pécs (Fünfkirchen). Louis also sought to bring about the conversion of the Slavonic peoples living to the south of Hungary, who held to the Greek Church, the Serbs, Wallachians, and Bulgarians. His attempts to convert them led to repeated conflicts with these races. In this reign began the struggle with the growing power of the Turks, against whose assaults Hungary now became the bulwark of Europe. Internal disorders broke out again in the reign of Maria (1382–95), the daughter of Louis, in which the Church suffered greatly in the southern part of the kingdom, especially in Croatia. In Hungary proper the queen sought to further the interests of the Church. The most important measures passed at a synod at Gran were decisions regarding the training of the clergy. Maria built several churches of the Perpetual Adoration. From 1387 her rule was merely nominal, her husband Sigismund being the real ruler. After Maria's death he became her successor.

In one of the first years (1397) of Sigismund's reign (1395-1436), the decrees of the Diet of 1387 were renewed. These declared that no ecclesiastical benefice could be bestowed on a foreign ecclesiastic. Sigismund, however, paid little attention to this regulation. Immediately on entering upon his reign Sigismund came into conflict with the Hungarian oligarchy. This led to open war, and even, for a time, to the imprisonment of the king. In 1403, King Ladislaus of Naples appeared as rival king; nevertheless, Sigismund was able to maintain himself on the throne. His reign was coincident with a large part of the Great Western Schism, and the two great reforming Councils of Constance and Basle were held while he was on the throne. In the Great Schism, Hungary adhered to the obedience (or party) of the Roman claimant to the papacy. Louis I, the Great, had supported Urban VI, and his successors, Maria and Sigismund, also sided with the Roman Curia. Sigismund, indeed, in 1403 renounced Boniface IX, because this pope supported the rival King Ladislaus, yet he did not recognize Benedict XIII. At a later date he recognized Innocent VII and subsequently supported the Roman Curia. In 1404 the Diet declared that in future ecclesiastical benefices in Hungary could only be bestowed by the king, consequently the rights both of spiritual and secular patrons were annulled, and the jus placeti introduced, according to which papal bulls and commands could only be accepted and proclaimed in Hungary after they had received the royal approval. Supported by these enactments Sigismund at once asserted his right to appoint bishops. Naturally, the Curia did not recognize this claim and refused to give the investiture to the bishops chosen by Sigismund. Upon this Sigismund, in 1410, appealed to John XXIII, from whom he requested the recognition of this right. John did not accede to this request, although he granted investiture to the bishops appointed by the king and thus tacitly recognized the royal right of filling benefices, a right which, as a matter of fact, the king continued to exercise.

After his election as King of the Romans, Sigismund endeavoured to bring the schism to an end. The unity of the Church was restored by the Council of Constance, and the concordat made with Germany was also authoritative for Hungary. While the council was in session, after the deposition of Benedict XIII, Sigismund obtained for himself and his successors the right of naming the bishops. This right was, indeed, not put into documentary form, but Stephen Werböczi, in his collection of the Hungarian laws "Opus Tripartitum juris consuetudinarii regni Hungariæ", asserted that this right was conceded to the King of Hungary at the Council of Constance, and Cardinal Peter Pázmány also referred to it at a later date. The council further decided that in Hungary ecclesiastical cases should be tried in the country itself, and not brought before the Roman Curia, that only appeals could be taken to Rome. After the council had closed Sigismund claimed to the fullest extent the rights which had been conceded to him by the council. The Republic of Venice having seized Dalmatia, the Archdioceses of Spalato and Zara, with their suffragans, were lost to Hungary. This is the reason why in Hungarian official documents for many years these dioceses were given as vacant. In Hungary proper the Church maintained itself with difficulty in the northern districts, on account of the incursions of the Hussites, who traversed all upper Hungary, plundering the churches and laying waste the country. They also gained adherents in the southern districts, where, however, the movement was soon suppressed, thanks to the missionary activity of the Franciscan monk James of the Marches.

The chief source of anxiety to the government of Hungary in Sigismund's reign was the growing power of the Turks. Since 1389 when Servia was conquered by the Osmanli power at the battle of Kosova (also called Amselfeld, "Field of the Blackbirds"), the Turks had slowly but steadily advanced against Hungary. In 1396 Sigismund undertook a campaign on a large scale against them, but met with a severe defeat at Nicopolis. To safeguard the Hungarian frontier, Sigismund obtained from Stephen Lazarevícs, ruler of Servia, by the Treaty of Tata (Totis), in 1426, the Servian fortresses on the border of the two countries, but he was not able to hold them against the Turks. The siege of the fortress of Galambócz (1428) ended with his defeat and narrow escape from death. The power of the Turks steadily increased, and Sigismund's successors were only able to check momentarily the westward advance of the Ottoman Empire. Sigismund was succeeded by his son-in-law Albert (1437–39); in this reign the influence of the Hungarian nobility was again paramount. The Turks recommenced their inroads, entering the country near Szendrö. After Albert's death a dispute as to the succession arose between Wladislaw I (Wladislaw III of Poland) and the adherents of Albert's posthumous son Ladislaus. In the end Wladislaw I (1442–44) became ruler; his short reign is chiefly noted for the wars with the Turks, in which the Hungarian forces were led by János Hunyady. Wladislaw I fell in battle with the Turks at Varna, Bulgaria, where he was defeated; after his death Hungary was thrown into confusion by the quarrels among the ruling nobles. To put an end to these disorders the inferior nobility undertook to bring the country again into unity and made Hunyady governor during the minority of Ladislaus V, Posthumus, appointing with him an administrative council. While at the head of the government, Hunyady fought successfully against the Turks. During his control of affairs also, the appointment to ecclesiastical benefices was considered the prerogative of the Crown, and it was accordingly exercised by him and his council. During the reign of Ladislaus V (1453–57) the leading nobles regained control; this led once more to disturbances, especially after the death of Hunyady. While Ladislaus was king, Constantinople was taken by the Turks (1453), who now turned all their strength against Hungary. Hunyady won, indeed, the brilliant victory over them at Belgrad (1456), but he died a few days later. The hatred of the great nobles against him was now turned against his sons, one of whom, Ladislaus, was executed. When King Ladislaus died, Hunyady's son, Matthias I, Corvinus, became king.

Matthias I (1458–90) was almost continually engaged in conflict with the Ottoman power. Pope Pius II promised the most vigorous support to the king in this struggle, but the efforts of the Holy See to organize a general European crusade against the Turks proved unavailing because of the pope's death. Notwithstanding the lack of help from other countries, Matthias battled for a time with success against the Turks in Bosnia, and to him it is due that their advance was temporarily checked. In 1463 Bosnia was conquered by the Turks, and with this the dioceses in Bosnia ceased to exist. On account of the Ottoman invasion the see of the Bishop of Corbavia had to be transferred to Modrus as early as 1460. Up to 1470 Matthias maintained friendly relations with the Catholic Church, but after 1471 his policy changed. The second half of his reign was characterized by a number of serious blunders. Notwithstanding the enactments of the law he gave a number of dioceses to foreigners; in 1472 he appointed John Beckensloer Archbishop of Gran (Esztergom), in 1480 he gave the archdiocese to the seventeen-year-old John of Aragon, and in 1486 to Ippolito d'Este, who was seven years old. Foreigners were also appointed to the Dioceses of Grosswardein (Nagy-Várad), Pécs (Fünfkirchen), and Eger (Erlau). Matthias also rewarded political services with ecclesiastical offices, and treated the property of the Church as though it belonged to the State. His relations with the Holy See, originally friendly, gradually grew strained, and he went so far as to threaten to join the Greek Church. In 1488 Angelo Pecchinoli was sent to Hungary by the pope as legate. Probably through the influence of his wife Beatrice, the king was led into more peaceful relations with the papacy, so that there was a better condition of affairs in the last years of his reign.

It was while Matthias was sovereign that humanism appeared in Hungary. The king himself was a vigorous supporter of the humanistic movement and the remains of his renowned library at Buda, the Bibliotheca Corvina, still excite wonder. The king's example led others, especially the bishops, to cultivate the arts and learning. Among the ecclesiastics who competed with the king in the promotion of learning were Joannes Vitéz, Urban Döczi, and Thomas Bakácz. At times, however, the ardour with which Matthias supported learning slackened, thus he did not give his aid to the universities already existing at Pécs (Fünfkirchen) and Pozsony (Presburg), so that later they had to be closed. After the death of Matthias there were once more several claimants for the throne. Matthias had sought in the last years of his life to have his illegitimate son Joannes Corvinus recognized as his successor. After his death the nation divided into two parties; one was influenced by the Queen-Dowager Beatrice, who wanted the crown for herself, the other desired a foreign ruler. Finally the King of Bohemia, Wladislaw II (1490-1516), of the Polish House of Jagellon, obtained the throne. In this reign the power of Hungary rapidly declined. Naturally vacillating and indolent, Wladislaw had not the force to withstand the determination of the great Hungarian nobles to rule, and the royal power became the plaything of the various parties. The antagonisms of the different ranks of society grew more acute and led, in 1514, to a great peasant revolt, directed against the nobles and clergy, which was only suppressed after much bloodshed. The Diet of 1498 passed enactments correcting the ecclesiastical abuses that had become prevalent during the reign of Matthias and prohibited particularly the appointment of foreigners to ecclesiastical positions. Among other enactments were those that forbade the granting of church offices to any but natives, the holding of ecclesiastical pluralities, and the appropriation of church lands by the laity. Wladislaw, however, was too weak to enforce these enactments. One of the particular evils of his reign was the holding of church dignities by minors; this arose partly from the granting of the royal right of patronage to different families. One of the most prominent ecclesiastical princes of this period was Thomas Bakácz, who was first Bishop of Györ and Eger, and later Archbishop of Gran. His eminent qualities made him for a time a candidate for the papal see. It was owing to his efforts that the offices of primate and legatus natus were permanently united with the Archbishopric of Gran.

Under the successor of Wladislaw, Louis II (1516–26), Hungary sank into complete decay. The authority of the sovereign was no longer regarded; energetic measures could not be taken against the incursions of the Turks, on account of the continual quarrels and dissensions, and the fate of the country was soon sealed. In 1521 Belgrad fell into the hands of the Turks, and Hungary was now at their mercy. In 1526 the country gathered together its resources for the decisive struggles. At the battle of Mohács (29 August 1526) Louis II was killed, and Catholic Hungary was defeated and overthrown by the Turks. The universal political decline of Hungary in the reign of Louis II was accompanied by the decline of its religious life. The education of the clergy sank steadily, and the secular lords grew more and more daring in their seizure of church property. Ecclesiastical training and discipline decayed. The southern part of Hungary was almost entirely lost to the Church through the advance of the Turks. Thousands of the inhabitants of the southern districts were carried off as prisoners or killed, monasteries and churches were destroyed, and the place of the Catholic population was taken by large numbers of Serbs who were adherents of the Orthodox Greek Church. The Serbs had begun to settle in Hungary in the time of Matthias I, so that during the reign of Louis II several Orthodox Greek bishops exercised their office there. In the first half of the sixteenth century the weakened condition of the Church in Hungary offered a favourable opportunity to the Lutheran Reformation. The new religion gained adherents especially in the cities where the bishops had been obliged to give the management of ecclesiastical affairs to others; the control had thereby passed into the hands of the city authorities, who in the course of time claimed for themselves the right of patronage. Luther's German writings soon found a ready reception among the inhabitants of the cities, and before long Lutheran preachers appeared; these came largely from Silesia, which had active intercourse with Hungary, and soon settled even im Buda and in the neighbourhood of the king. Exceedingly severe laws were passed by the Hungarian Diets of 1523 and 1525 against Lutherans; in 1523 the penalty of death and loss of property was enacted, and in 1525 the Diet condemned Lutherans to death at the stake. Owing to these laws Lutheranism did not gain much headway in Hungary before 1526. However, in the confusion which followed the death of Louis II, the new religion steadily gained ground.

From the Battle of Mohács to the Treaty of Szatmár (1526–1711) 
Upon the death of Louis II, Hungary was once more a prey to disputes over the succession. Ferdinand of Austria claimed the crown on the ground of a compact between the Emperor Maximilian and Wladislaw II, while the national party elected John Zápolya as king. To these two opposing elements should be added the Ottoman power, which after the conquest of Buda (1541) ruled a large part of the land. The main result of the triple political division of Hungary was the almost complete disappearance of public order and of the systematic conduct of affairs; another was the evident decline of Catholicism and the rapid advance of the Reformation. The growth of the new religion was evident soon after the battle of Mohács. It was encouraged by the existing political conditions of Hungary: the dispute over the succession, with the accompanying civil war; the lack of a properly educated Catholic clergy; the transfer of a large amount of church land to the laity; and the claims made by both aspirants to the throne upon the episcopal domains. The foreign armies and their leaders, sent by Ferdinand I to Hungary, also aided in the spread of the new doctrine, which first appeared in the mountain towns of upper Hungary and then extended into the other parts of this division of the country. In western Hungary, on the farther side of the Danube, larger or smaller centres of Lutheranism sprang up under the protection of the nobility and distinguished families. These beginnings of the new doctrine grew rapidly under such encouragement. Catholicism in Hungary was not in a position to oppose this movement at the outset; a properly trained clergy were lacking, on account of the difficulties in the way of education caused by the political confusion. In the first decades there was no open rupture between the Catholic and Lutheran Churches, outwardly everything was Catholic, confession remained unchanged, and at the most Communion under both species was introduced, so that there was little apparent distinction between the two religions.

The Ottoman occupation of Buda, in 1541, was a great blow to the Church in Hungary. A large part of the country was now under Ottoman sovereignty; Mohammedanism gained a footing in these districts, and the bishops and chapters had to withdraw. The churches gained by the Turks were changed into mosques, and Mohammedan preachers settled in the country. The faith of Islam, however, did not take real hold on the population; conversions were relatively few. On the other hand, the Ottoman occupation promoted Protestantism both directly and indirectly. During this period Protestantism entered Transylvania and soon gained ascendancy there. The Hungarian Diets of 1542, 1544, and 1548 passed far-reaching enactments for the protection of the Catholic Faith, such as banishment of the foreign preachers, the return of the sequestrated church lands, etc., but, owing to the confused state of public affairs, these laws were not carried out. Besides Lutheranism, Calvinism also took root in Hungary at this time, and from 1547 were added the teachings of the Anabaptists, who won adherents in the western counties of upper Hungary and in Transylvania. In 1556 the districts on the farther side of the Theiss accepted the Reformed religion. The revival of the Catholic Church began under Nicholas Oláhus, Archbishop of Gran (1553–68), who for this purpose held a national synod in 1561. He founded a seminary for boys at Nagy-Szombat (Tyrnau), and put the Jesuits in charge of it. His example was followed by other bishops, but the death (1564) of Ferdinand I put an end for a time to the efforts for reform in the Church. The religious indifference of Ferdinand's successor, Maximilian II (1564–76), worked great injury to the Church. In his earlier years Maximilian had been strongly inclined to the new creed, a fact of which the preachers of these doctrines took advantage, so that towards the end of his reign a majority of the great nobles of Hungary had become Protestants, thereby greatly encouraging the spread of the new doctrines. Maximilian's failure to fill the archiepiscopal See of Gran, which fell vacant in 1573, caused a further decline of the Catholic religion, nor did his successor, Rudolf II, fill the vacancy until some time after ascending the throne. In the first years of the reign of Rudolf II (1576-1608) religious conditions changed but little; later, the position of the Catholic clergy improved after the entrance of the Jesuits, who improved the education of the clergy. Thus, at the end of the seventeenth century the Catholic clergy were ready to carry on the struggle against Protestantism in public disputations.

In this reign began the reclaiming of the churches, founded by Catholics, which had been occupied by Protestants. At the same time also began, although slowly, the conversion of the Protestant nobility, but the revolt of Stephen Bocskay again led to a decline of Catholicism. The Treaty of Vienna, of 1606, secured freedom for the Lutheran and Reformed faiths, as well as for the Catholics. In the reign of Matthias II (1608–19) the Treaty of Vienna of 1606 was confirmed by the Diet of 1608, and religious freedom was extended to the cities and villages. The Diet also granted the Protestants the right to elect their own administrative heads, so that the Protestants could now organize as an ecclesiastical body. The highest political honour of Hungary, the dignity of Palatine (president of the Diet and representative of the king) was in this era held by Protestants. Stephen Illésházy and George Thurzö followed each other in this office and, as was natural, defended their religion.

To this period also belong the taking of a more determined position by the Catholic Church against Protestantism and the beginning of the Counter-Reformation. Francis Forgách, Bishop of Nyitra (Neutra), later Archbishop of Gran, took up the struggle against Protestantism. Together with his clergy, he protested, although in vain, against the ordinances of the Diet of 1608; the Diet of 1609 rejected his protest. It also opposed Peter Pázmány, later Archbishop of Gran, who, as a member of the Society of Jesus, had developed a remarkable activity. In 1613 appeared his chief work, "Hodegus", that is, "Guide to Divine Faith", to which for a long time no reply was made by Protestantism (see PETER PÁZMÁNY). Through the efforts of Pázmány and his fellow Jesuits, the Catholics formed a majority in the Diet of 1618. At this Diet the Protestants endeavoured to get control of the village churches also, and tried to have an enactment passed giving a Protestant village the right to the church against the will of the lord of the manor, but they did not succeed. In 1619 a revolt for the preservation of Protestant interests broke out; it was led by Gabriel Bethlen, ruler of Transylvania, whose cause was espoused by the Protestant nobles of Hungary. The insurrection spread rapidly; Kassa (Kaschau), the chief town of upper Hungary, was captured by Bethlen, who by the end of 1619 was seeking to become King of Hungary. A threatened attack by the Turks forced Bethlen in 1620 to agree to an armistice with the king. A Diet was held at Beszterczebánya (Neusohl) by Bethlen in July and August 1620, which elected him King of Hungary. The Diet confiscated the domains of the Church and suppressed all dioceses except three. Bethlen, however, was not able to maintain himself long and was obliged, by the end of 1621, to agree to peace with Ferdinand II (1619–35) at Nikolsburg. In religious affairs the treaty was based on the Treaty of Vienna of 1606 and the enactments of the Diet of 1608.

The Catholic Church now steadily increased. Thousands of those who had fallen away returned to the Faith. This at times led to renewed struggles when the Protestants were not willing to consent to the return of the churches. Their efforts at the Diets to retain the churches when the lord of the manor was converted, and the serfs remained Protestant, failed, as what they desired was contrary to the provision of the civil law. During the reign of Ferdinand III (1635–57) occurred, in 1644, the insurrection for the defence of the rights of the Protestants, led by George Rákóczy I; the war came to an end with the Peace of Linz (1645). This treaty secured complete religious freedom even to the serfs, and contained ordinances concerning the use of the churches, cemeteries, and bells; the expulsion of the Protestant ministers from the towns and villages was forbidden, etc. The Diet of 1646 went thoroughly into the religious question. The final decision of the king gave the Protestants 90 of the 400 churches they claimed; where they were not given the church they obtained suitable land for building. To carry out these ordinances, however, proved very difficult; strong opposition was manifested, and conditions remained very much the same up to 1670. A great change in religious affairs was caused by the discovery of the conspiracy of Francis Wesselényi and his companions, to make Hungary independent of Austria. A large number of the conspirators were Protestant; thus it came about that the civil war that broke out after the discovery of the conspiracy soon became a religious war. The Government succeeded in suppressing the rebellion and erected at Pozsony (Presburg) a special court for the conviction of the Protestants. The revolt of Emeric Thököly, in 1678, once more injured the Catholic cause; up to 1684 Thököly had control of a large part of the country, and the Protestants took up arms against the Catholics. In 1681 the Diet was summoned to put an end to these disordered conditions. The Protestants, however, laid before it a list of demands; some of them were conceded by the king, but the Protestants were not satisfied, and the struggle between Catholics and Protestants did not cease for a long time. These continual dissensions brought internal affairs into great disorder, the tension between the two religions showed itself also in social life, and the decline in moral character was evident among the population. The Catholic Church suffered great losses, churches and schools fell into decay, the regular clergy were driven away, their possessions and lands confiscated, etc. The judgments pronounced by the courts against the Protestants gave foreign Protestant princes the opportunity to interfere in the internal affairs of the country, which naturally brought inconvenience with it.

The recovery of Buda (Ofen) from the Turks led to a change very favourable to the Church. There were no longer Protestant revolts, and, as the Turks were driven out, the Church regained possession of its lost territories. Ecclesiastical affairs in these districts were now reorganized, new churches were built, new clergy sent, etc. In claiming its former property the Church met with the opposition of the Government, which would not consent to the restoration of ecclesiastical lands without legal proof. The relations of the denominations were settled by the Diet of 1687 on the basis of the enactments of the Diet of 1681; freedom of conscience was granted, with safeguards of the rights of lords-of-the-manor, the return of the banished Protestant ministers was permitted, the Protestant nobles were allowed to build churches for their private use, etc. These enactments, however, soon proved insufficient, and what was lacking was settled by royal edict as cases requiring decision appeared. The Diet of 1687 also acknowledged the Hungarian Crown to be hereditary in the Habsburg family and in addition to this renounced the free election of the king.

The opening of the eighteenth century was signalized by the outbreak of a revolution headed by Francis Rákóczy II. The only damage which this did to the Church was that the work of consolidation and reorganization was delayed for a time. The revolt was purely political and did not degenerate into a religious war; in the districts which sided with Rákóczy the Catholic clergy also supported the prince. In 1705 Rákóczy held a Diet at Szécsény which passed laws regarding religious questions; the religious ordinances of the Diets of 1608 and 1647 were renewed; religious freedom was granted to serfs; in those places where the population was of both religions the one to which the majority of the inhabitants belonged received the church, while the minority had the right to build one for itself. After the session of the Diet of Onod in 1707, where the independence of Hungary was declared, and the Habsburg dynasty deposed, political conditions were for a short time unfavourable to the Church, as Protestantism was granted larger influence in the affairs of the Government, but this soon passed away. King Joseph I held a Diet at Pozsony (Presburg) in 1708, at which the religious question was again brought forward, but no agreement was reached. The Protestants made large demands, but the Government would not concede more than was contained in the laws of 1681 and 1687. Soon after this the revolt headed by Rákóczy came to an end and in the Peace of Szatmár (1711) the country once more obtained rest from political disorder. The regulations of the treaty in regard to religion were that the Government should maintain the laws of 1681 and 1687 which granted the free exercise of religion to persons of every denomination; consequently religious freedom was conceded the Protestants.

From the Peace of Szatmár (1711) to the uprising of 1848 
For a long period after the Peace of Szatmár Catholic Hungary was undisturbed. During this era the reorganization and strengthening of the Catholic Church could be vigorously carried on. The colonization of the regions regained from the Turks in the later decades of the seventeenth century, and of the districts surrounding the River Temes, began after 1716. The colonists were foreigners, largely Germans, who held the Catholic Faith. As a result of this and other settlements, the Catholic population rapidly increased, so that in 1805 there were 5,105,381 Catholics to 1,983,366 Protestants. The number of the parishes also grew greatly, especially in the country formerly under Turkish rule. The churches in the hands of the Protestants were reclaimed anew, but this once more led to intense friction. In order to restore religious peace, Emperor Charles VI, who was Charles Ill of Hungary (1711–40), appointed a commission for religious affairs, the decisions of which, however, were not sanctioned until 1731. These enactments, called Resolutio Carolina, confirmed the laws of 1681 and 1687 regarding religious affairs. Protestants were permitted the public exercise of their religion in the western districts of the country, according to the provisions of the law of 1681, and the private exercise of it everywhere. The Protestant ministers were forbidden to live outside of the places legally designated, but the members of their faith could seek them where they abode. The authority of the superintendents over the pastors was limited to disciplinary matters; in secular matters the pastors were subject to the civil jurisdiction. Matters pertaining to marriage were placed under the control of the bishop; the decision, however, was given in accordance with Protestant enactments. In regard to mixed marriages, it was enacted that the marriage must be entered upon before the Catholic priest, and the children be brought up in the Catholic religion.

Regarding church buildings the enactments of the laws of 1687 were declared to be in force. These are the more important ordinances of the Resolutio, which were supplemented later by various royal decisions. Charles VI was the last male descendant of the Habsburgs, and he sought to have the succession to the throne secured to his daughter; this was enacted by the Diet of 1723. When Charles died his daughter Maria Theresa (1740–80), on the strength of this law, succeeded him on the Hungarian throne. During her reign the ordinances of the Resolutio Carolina were strictly enforced; in reply to the complaints brought against it by the Protestants, the queen said that she did not intend to make any concessions outside of those contained in the law. The Catholic Church rapidly developed in this reign. There was no longer a lack of priests for parish work, and the bishops sought to train up capable and well-educated persons for the pastorate. The religious orders increased so largely under Maria Theresa that enactments were issued in 1770 to check the growth of their numbers. According to a census of this year, there were in Hungary 3570 male religious, including 191 hermits; this number was made by law the maximum which was not to be exceeded. Great stress was also laid upon the development of education, new schools and institutions for education were established, and the queen directed her attention also to advanced instruction. The university at Nagy-Szombat (Tyrnau), founded by Peter Pazmány, was completed in 1769 by the addition of a medical faculty; it was removed in 1776 to Buda, and in 1780 to Pest; in 1777 the Ratio educationis was issued, which regulated the entire system of education.

The suppression of the Jesuits occurred during the reign of Maria Theresa, and the order ceased to exist in Hungary. Its possessions, which became the property of the Crown, were used for the promotion of education. New dioceses were also formed at this time; in 1776 the Dioceses of Beszterczebánya (Neusohl), Rozsnyó (Rosenau), and Szepes (Zips) were founded; in 1777 the Dioceses of Szombathely (Steinamanger), and Székes Fehévár (Stuhlweissenburg). In regard to the filling of the bishoprics, Art. XV of 1741 enacted that only natives should be appointed to the sees. This decree was contrary to the custom followed by the predecessors of Maria Theresa, under whom it frequently happened that ecclesiastical dignities were bestowed on foreigners. From 1770 the queen also reserved to herself the appointment of canons. The taxing of ecclesiastical benefices, which had existed from 1717, and had received at that time the papal confirmation, was later renewed from decade to decade, and finally, in 1765, was treated as a permanent tax.

The Church suffered greatly during the reign of Joseph II (1780–90), the son and successor of Maria Theresa. The Edict of Toleration, which annulled the Resolutio Carolina, was issued 25 October 1781. This decree made large concessions to the Protestants; thus it was enacted that wherever there were one hundred Protestant families they could freely exercise their religion and might build churches without steeples or bells in such places. The Protestants were also permitted to hold public offices; it was further enacted that they could not be forced to take an oath opposed to their religious convictions and were released from observing the Catholic feast days. Matters connected with the marriage of Protestants were placed under the control of the secular courts. All the children of a mixed marriage were to be brought up as Catholics when the father was a Catholic; if he were not, then only the daughters were to be Catholics. These ordinances worked much harm to the Catholic faith; moreover the Emperor Joseph interfered in various other ecclesiastical matters. He reserved to himself the right of founding new parishes; diocesan seminaries were replaced by state institutions, ecclesiastical affairs were put under the control of a special Hungarian commission; edicts were also issued in regard to the administration of church lands etc. These ordinances were a source of much damage to the Church, but the emperor went even further. With a few exceptions — the teaching orders and those who had the cure of souls — he suppressed all the religious orders in Hungary and confiscated their property. He also provoked a rupture with the Holy See, and even the journey of Pope Pius VI to Vienna did not produce any change in the ecclesiastical policy of the emperor. The universal discontent which the edicts of the emperor had called forth obliged Joseph, who had refused to be crowned King of Hungary, to withdraw before his death (1790) all his enactments, with the exception of the edict of toleration and the decree concerning the serfs.

In the reign of Leopold II (1790–92), the Diet of 1790-91 granted the Protestants complete independence in the management of their ecclesiastical affairs. Liberty of religious belief was recognized, and the enactments of the Government were not allowed to affect any matters concerning Protestant churches and schools. In regard to mixed marriages it was decreed that these should be solemnized before a Catholic priest, who was not permitted to prevent such a marriage. The children of a mixed marriage were to be brought up in the Catholic Faith when the father was a Catholic; when he was not, then only the sons were trained in the religion of the father. While this decree gave the Protestants various advantages, and especially guaranteed their autonomy, the Catholic Church suffered much damage. The administration continually sought to secure greater influence in its affairs; in the years of war it demanded increasingly greater aid from the Catholic clergy and allowed a number of the wealthiest ecclesiastical benefices to remain vacant in order to enjoy their revenues during vacancy. Thus, for example, the archiepiscopal See of Gran remained vacant for nearly twenty years. During the reign of Francis I (1792-1835) there was no change for a long period in ecclesiastical affairs. For this the king was largely responsible; he looked with no friendly eye on clerical activity in politics, although the clergy, on account of their position in the country and their wealth, were well fitted to take part in political affairs. The Dioceses of Kassa (Kaschau) and Szatmár were founded in 1804, and at a later date the Diocese of Eger (Erlau) was raised to an archdiocese with the Dioceses of Szepes (Zips), Rozsnyó (Rosenau), Kassa (Kaschau), and Szatmár as suffragans. In 1802 the Benedictine, Cistercian, and Premonstratensian Orders were re-established. In order to elevate religious life and ecclesiastical discipline, the Prince Primate Alexander Rudnay held a great national synod in 1822, at which ordinances in regard to the improvement of the schools were passed.

It was not until the Diet of 1832-36 that the affairs of the Church were again brought up. The occasion was the question of mixed marriages and of changes to the Protestant religion. In regard to the latter, Art. XXVI of 1791, Sec. 13, decreed that the change to Protestantism could only take place with royal permission and after six weeks' instruction. The Protestants made strenuous efforts to have this article of the law annulled, but for a long time they were not successful. It was not until the Diet of 1844 that the Protestants secured a settlement of the matter in accordance with their wishes; Art. III of 1844 repealed the requirements of the royal consent and the six weeks' instruction, and decreed instead that the change of faith must be twice notified to the parish priest within four weeks in the presence of two witnesses. If the parish priest refused to grant a certificate of this fact, the witnesses could draw it up.

The second question that arose in this period, that of mixed marriages, had been last regulated by the Diet of 1790–1791. The law contained enactments, as mentioned above, concerning the religion of children of mixed marriages, but the cases increased in which the parents made a formal declaration promising to bring the children up as Catholics. In 1793 there was a Protestant agitation against this declaration, and when, in the years 1830–1840, the question of mixed marriages was discussed in Germany the controversy in that country influenced conditions in Hungary. In mixed marriages the Catholic clergy continued to demand the signing of a formal declaration. The Bishop of Nagy-Várad (Grosswardein) was the first bishop to order (1839) that only those mixed marriages could have the blessing of the Church in which the religion of the children was settled by a declaration in favour of the Catholic Faith. The Protestants demanded again from the Diet of 1839-40 the suppression of the declaration. The pastoral letter of 2 July 1840, of the Hungarian bishops bound the clergy to passive assistance in mixed marriages in which Catholic interests were not guarded — that is, where the formal declaration was not made. This ordinance aroused much feeling, and several ecclesiastics were fined on account of passive assistance. The bishops now turned to Rome, and the Holy See confirmed the pastoral letter, with the addition that mixed marriages were indeed forbidden, but that such marriages were valid, even when not entered on before a priest, if two witnesses were present. The Diet of 1843-44 allowed mixed marriages to be entered upon before Protestant clergy; the Catholic mother, however, received the right, with the permission of the father, to bring up all of the children in the Catholic Faith.

The uprising of 1848 to World War I 

The agitation of 1848 and the Hungarian Revolution of 1848–1849, besides changing political and social conditions, also affected the interests of the Church. The Diet of 1848 decreed the equality and reciprocity of all recognized confessions. In 1849 the minister of education and public worship, Horváth, desired to grant Catholic autonomy, but after the suppression of the Hungarian Revolution it came to nothing. Large numbers of the Catholic clergy took part in the Hungarian Revolution, a fact which in the following years of absolutism led to their persecution by the Government. During the period of autocratic rule the ordinances of the Austrian Concordat of 1855 were made authoritative for Hungary also, and in accordance with its enactments provincial synods for settling various ecclesiastical affairs were held in 1858 and 1863. Although the Concordat granted greater freedom to the Hungarian Church, yet the administration of the fund for religion and education remained in the hands of the Government. In 1853 political reasons led to the elevation of the Diocese of Zágráb (Agram) to an archdiocese having as suffragans the Sees of Diakovár, Zengg-Modrus, and Körös, and later to the founding of the Archdiocese of Fogaras. The erection of this archdiocese violated the rights of the Primate of Hungary; this led to repeated, but ineffectual, protests.

The period of absolutism in Hungary came to an end with the coronation of Francis Joseph I as King of Hungary (8 June 1867), and the laws of 1848 were once more in force. The responsible parliamentary Government and Parliament exercised much influence on the affairs of the Church. The first laws touching ecclesiastical questions undoubtedly worked much injury to the Church, as the Common School Law of 1868 (Art. XXXVIII), which left to the inhabitants of a community the decision as to whether the common school was to be denominational or communal; also Art. XLVIII which, in regard to divorce in mixed marriages, enacted that such cases might be brought by the respective parties before the competent spiritual authorities recognized by each, and that each must be bound by the decision of his, or her, own spiritual authority. This enactment led many to change to the Protestant religion. Art. LIII of 1868 enacted, in regard to the children of mixed marriages, that the children should follow the creed of the parent of the same sex, and that this must be enforced even after the death of the parent, as, for example, after the death of the Protestant father, the Catholic mother could not bring up in the Catholic Faiththe minor children belonging to the Protestant confession. It was also decreed that, when one of the parents changed his religion, the child could not follow this change unless under seven years of age. These enactments led later to a bitter ecclesiastico-political struggle.

Various efforts were made in Parliament, between 1869–72, to injure the Church, as in the bills introducing civil marriage, civil registration, complete religious liberty, etc. However, of these measures, those regarding civil marriages, the keeping of the registers by civil officials, etc., were not enforced until a much later date. Serious complications arose upon the promulgation of the dogma of Infallibility by the Vatican Council in 1870. The Government, supported by the jus placeti, forbade its publication; a royal reproof was sent in 1871 to the Bishop of Székes-Fehérvár (Stuhlweissenburg), Jekelfalussy, who officially published the dogma. The Kulturkampf in Germany (1872–75) produced in Hungary a movement hostile to the Church. Agitation was also caused by the passing of Art. XI of 1879; it enacted that the reception into another religious denomination, in so far as it was contrary to Art. LIII of 1868, was subject to legal penalty. The difficulties arising from the interpretation of this law lasted for a long time. In 1883 a bill on the marriage of Catholics and Jews was laid before the Parliament but was twice rejected by the Upper House and finally withdrawn by the Government. The ministry of Koloman Tisza, which lasted longer (1875–89) than any other since 1867, inflicted further damage upon the Catholic Church. Protestantism spread in all directions and received active support from the Government. The revision of the constitution of the Upper House (House of Magnates) in 1885 (Art. VII) excluded Catholic auxiliary bishops from membership, with the exception of the Auxiliary Bishops of Nándor-Fehérvár and Knin (Tinin) According to this law, the dignitaries of the Catholic Church, both of the Latin and Greek Rites, entitled to membership in the Upper House since that time are the prince-primate and the other archbishops and diocesan bishops, the Auxiliary Bishops of Nándor-Fehérvár and Knin, the Archabbot of Pannonhalma (Martinsberg), the Provost of Jászó (Premonstratensian Order), and the Prior of Auranien; the representatives of the Orthodox Greek Church are the Patriarch of Karlocza (Karlowitz), the Metropolitan of Gyula-Fehérvár (Karlsburg), and the diocesan bishops; of the Protestant Churches, their highest clerical and lay dignitaries.

In the first years of the last decade of the nineteenth century a far-reaching movement threatened the Church in Hungary. An ecclesiastico-political conflict began, caused by the decree of the Minister of Education and Public Worship, Count Csáky. This decree provided that any priest who performed a baptism according to Art. LIII of 1868 must send a certificate of baptism to the legally responsible clergyman within eight days. Neglect to obey this law was to be considered a misdemeanour, and punished accordingly. This decree, called the Wegtaufung Decree (baptism away from the other side) marked the beginning of a new ecclesiastico-political conflict. According to this edict a Catholic priest when he baptized a child belonging to another faith must send the certificate of baptism to the minister of the other denomination; such an enactment was regarded by the Catholic clergy as contrary to conscience and the canonical ordinances. The bishops did not order that the law be carried out, although they declared that for a time it could be tolerated; the greater part of the parish priests, however, refused to obey it. A Catholic agitation for the modification in the interest of the Church of Art. LIII of 1868, and for the repeal of the decree issued by Csáky, did not succeed, while the supporters of the Government soon made use of the movement to further the introduction of obligatory civil marriage, civil registration, and the free exercise of religion. These latter proposals became law during the premiership of Alexander Wekerle. In 1893 the ecclesiastical bills were laid before the Diet, and after long debates, being once rejected by the House of Magnates, they became law in 1894 and took effect 1 October 1895. Articles XXXI and XXXIII of 1894 contain enactments regarding marriage and registration. Civil marriage is made compulsory, and government recognition is only given to civil registration. Article XXXII of 1894 enacts that the parents can enter into an agreement before the registrar as to the religion of the children. Registrars are appointed by the minister of the interior and are responsible to him; a parish priest cannot be appointed to this office. The Hungarian bishops protested against these laws and sent a memorial to the king requesting him not to sanction them; they were, however, unsuccessful. Article XLII of 1895 gave official recognition to the Jewish religion; at the same time the right to belong to no confession was granted.

A Kulturkampf did not, as had been feared, follow the passage of the ecclesiastico-political laws. Nevertheless, they led to the formation of a Catholic parliamentary party, the People's Party (Volkspartei), which made the revision of the ecclesiastico-political laws the chief measure of their programme. As early as the election for members of the Diet which followed the taking effect of these laws the People's Party nominated candidates and up to the parliamentary election of 1906 it had 33 adherents among the members of the Lower House. The large proportions which the Catholic movement assumed in Hungary are due to this party. Catholic associations were founded in all parts of the land, and finally a union was formed which embraced the entire country. This reawakened Catholic consciousness led to the holding of national Catholic Congresses, which have now met for a number of years. These congresses have aided greatly in the strengthening and promulgation of Catholic opinions. The efforts of the Church in Hungary to gain autonomy for the protection of Catholic interests, especially in regard to the administration of Catholic foundations and schools, have so far been unsuccessful. The Diet of 1791 granted autonomy to the Protestants, but the Catholics neglected, at that time, to secure the same for themselves. It was not until 1848 that the first steps in this direction were taken by the holding of an episcopal conference to discuss the question. Nothing, however, resulted from these efforts, and the quickly following outbreak of the Revolution put the matter aside for the time being, nor was the question brought up during the period of absolutism. After the restoration of constitutional government the question of the autonomy of the Church was again raised, and in 1867 the bishops had a plan drawn up, which in 1868 was laid before a large assembly.

In 1870, a congress for the promotion of autonomy was called, and a commission appointed which in 1871 presented its first report. According to the plan it outlined there were to be formed a national congress and an administrative council. The national congress was to be under the guidance of the prince primate; subordinate to the congress were to be the diocesan conventions with a diocesan senate; below, there were to be the decanal and district senates, following which were the communal assemblies and the parishes. The incorporated autonomy council was to represent the interests of Catholics, to administer the property of the Church, and to be the advisory council of the king in the appointment of church dignitaries. The Congress of 1871 accepted this plan and laid it before the king, but no practical results followed. After this but little was done in the matter until 1897, when a new congress for the promotion of autonomy was called. A commission was appointed which finished its labours in three years, and in 1900 the congress reassembled. The plan of the majority claimed autonomy almost entirely for the episcopate and left the administration of the property to the Government. The opposition party in the congress demanded the control of the funds, the schools, and the right of presentation for the congress. The discussions lasted through the years 1901–1902; in the latter year the congress closed its labours and laid the results before the king, who reserved his decision. Since then nothing more has been done in the matter.

In 1909, after long negotiations, the question of the equalization of clerical salaries was finally settled (Art. XIII of 1909). The principal provisions of this law fix the salary of pastors of recognized religions at 1600 Kronen ($320) with a minimum of 800 Kronen ($160); that of curates and assistant pastors at 1000 Kronen ($200), with a minimum of 800 Kronen ($160); the value of I board and lodging is included in the salary of a curate or assistant, and this is reckoned at 500 Kronen ($100). In order to meet the expenses of the equalization, the higher ecclesiastics of the Catholic Church are annually taxed to the amount of 700,000 Kronen ($140,000), and the Hungarian fund for religion to the amount of 1,200,000 Kronen ($240,000). Ecclesiastical affairs are under the control of the Hungarian Ministry of Education and Public Worship, in which a separate department, having one of the higher church dignitaries at its head, has been formed. The appointment of bishops, canons, abbots, etc. belongs to the king and follows upon the presentation of the names, with ministerial approval, by the minister of education and public worship. The bishops enter upon their office, take their seats in the House of Magnates, and receive their revenues without awaiting the papal confirmation. A royal edict of 1870 revived the old royal jus placeti and ordained that only after receiving royal approval could decisions, constitutions, and decrees of councils and popes be promulgated in Hungary. It should also be mentioned that the bull "Ne Temere", recently issued by the Holy See in regard to mixed marriages, was not enforced in Hungary, owing to the representations of the Hungarian episcopate, but the provisions of the Constitution "Provida", issued for Germany in the same matter on 18 January 1906, were also extended to Hungary. According to the last census held in Austria–Hungary in 1910, out of the total number of about 7.6 million inhabitants of the territory of present-day Hungary, 62.8% declared themselves Roman Catholic, 22.4% Calvinist, 6.6% Lutheran, 6.2% Jewish, and 2.1% Greek Catholic. Following the collapse of the "Double Monarchy" at the end of the First World War, King Charles IV (1916–1918) abdicated on 16 November 1918, and the prime minister, Count Mihály Károlyi proclaimed Hungary a republic.

Interwar and postwar periods 
Mihály Károlyi decided to hand over power "to the proletariat" when the Entente Powers issued an ultimatum, demanding the evacuation of a large zone east of the Tisza. The new government led by the Communist Béla Kun declared Hungary a soviet republic on 21 March 1919. The counter-revolutionary propaganda did not fail to emphasize that over half of the commissars were of Jewish origin. Under the new regime Church property, along with schools so far run by the Churches, was nationalized. After 133 days of rule, the Communist regime collapsed when its offensive against the advancing Romanian troops proved abortive. After general elections, a new Parliament was convoked and Hungary was again proclaimed a kingdom. A "numerus clausus law" was soon adopted to reduce the ratio of Jewish students in universities. However, following the punitive Treaty of Trianon of 4 June 1920, that stripped Hungary of two-thirds of its territory, irredentism became the dominant political ideology.

During the predominant "Christian course" of the interwar period, the Churches received extensive support from the governments. Religion became a compulsory subject in state schools, and Christian-influenced extra-curricular activities (such as the Boy Scout or the specifically Hungarian "levente" movements) were also favored. When the Upper House of the Parliament was restored in 1926, 33 of its 244 members (19 Catholics, 6 Calvinists, 4 Lutherans, 1 Unitarian, 1 Greek-Orthodox, and 2 Jews) enjoyed seats by reason of ecclesiastical office. During this period, the Churches still owned 5,300 square kilometres (2,000 sq mi) of land, of which 86% was held by Catholic prelates.

In line with the views of Pope Pius XI, in the 1930s the Catholic hierarchy was critical of the growing influence of Nazism in Hungary. Anti-Semitic sentiment, however, became dominant, and anti-Jewish laws were adopted beginning in 1938. The Nazi "Final Solution" was brought about by the German occupation of Hungary in 1944. Even now some prelates including Vilmos Apor, the Catholic bishop of Győr – publicly protested Jewish persecution.

The Red Army entered Hungarian territory in September 1944. In December the "Provisional National Assembly", a non-elected body acknowledged by the Allies appointed a provisional government. One of its first acts was a radical land reform which affected 82% of the lands owned by the Churches. The occupation forces inflicted wreaked havoc on the population: men and women were deported to the Soviet Union as forced laborer, and there was large-scale rape of women throughout Hungary by the Soviet occupation forces. Bishop Vilmos Apor was himself mortally wounded when he attempted to save a young girl from rape at the hands of drunken Soviet soldiers.

In spite of a monarchist campaign led by József Mindszenty, Archbishop of Esztergom, Hungary was declared a republic on 1 February 1946. The Communist Party acquired power step by step, using its "salami tactics" in order to slice up its opposition. For instance, after the murder of a Soviet officer, about 1,500 "reactionary associations", such as the Catholic Youth Association, were dissolved in July 1946. Clergymen were excluded from the general elections held in November 1946. In 1949, Cardinal Mindszenty, who had in 1948 spoke of one kind of dictatorship being replaced with another, was brought to court upon similarly fabricated charges of espionage and subversion. Meanwhile, in 1947 a new law abolished all discriminations against those denominations that had not thereto received the "received" status.

Communist Hungary 
Hungary became a "People's Republic" in 1949 when a new constitution, modeled after the Stalinist constitution of the Soviet Union, was adopted. Obligatory religious instruction at schools was soon abolished. Monastic orders were also dissolved, except the remnants of one female and three male orders teaching in the few secondary schools exempted from the nationalization, and at the same time 3,820 monks and nuns were deported or imprisoned and tortured.

In 1951 a "State Office of Church Affairs" was created and entrusted with the task of bringing the Churches under the regime's authority and supervision. It paid particular attention to the selection of Church leaders. They were looking among the clergy both for idealists who became convinced that only communism had a future, and for men involved in illegal activities, mainly moral ones.

Third Hungarian Republic 
The communist political monopoly in Hungary disappeared in 1989. The Parliament passed the Law of Freedom of Conscience and Religion on 24 January 1990, which established the freedom of religion as a basic human right and that church activities were useful to society.

Latin hierarchy 

Archdiocese of Esztergom-Budapest with its suffragan dioceses:
Diocese of Győr
Diocese of Székesfehérvár
Archdiocese of Kalocsa-Kecskemét with its suffragan dioceses:
Diocese of Pécs
Diocese of Szeged–Csanád
Archdiocese of Eger with its suffragan dioceses:
Diocese of Debrecen–Nyíregyháza
Diocese of Vác
Archdiocese of Veszprém with its suffragan dioceses:
Diocese of Kaposvár
Diocese of Szombathely

Under the immediate jurisdiction of the Holy See in Rome are:
 the territorial abbey of Pannonhalma

Hungarian Greek Catholic hierarchy 

Archeparchy of Hajdúdorog with its suffragan eparchies:
Eparchy of Miskolc
Eparchy of Nyiregyhaza

See also
György Bulányi
Katolikus Ifjúsági Mozgalom
Stephen I of Hungary
Holy Crown of Hungary
Saint Stephen's Basilica
Esztergom Basilica
József Mindszenty
Regnum Marianum Community

References

Sources

External links
Homepage of the Catholic Church in Hungary (mostly in Hungarian)
Homepage of Fr. Damian Hungs (in German)